Sixty-four Guggenheim Fellowships were awarded in 1943. This year, fewer fellowships were awarded so funds could be saved for scholars unable to apply due to the war.

1943 U.S. and Canadian Fellows

1943 Latin American and Caribbean Fellows

See also
 Guggenheim Fellowship
 List of Guggenheim Fellowships awarded in 1942
 List of Guggenheim Fellowships awarded in 1944

References

1943
1943 awards